Maurice E. Post (1881–1958) was a Republican member of the Michigan House of Representatives.  He was a farmer in Rockford and represented Kent County in the legislature from 1933 until 1948; he ran for the Michigan State Senate in 1948, but did not survive the primary.  Post was an alternate delegate to the 1940 Republican National Convention.  He was a survivor of the Kerns Hotel fire in Lansing of December 11, 1934.

References

Republican Party members of the Michigan House of Representatives
People from Rockford, Michigan
1881 births
1958 deaths
Farmers from Michigan
20th-century American politicians